Wendy M. Grossman (born January 26, 1954) is a journalist, blogger, and folksinger. Her writing has been published in several newspapers, magazines, and specialized publications. She is the recipient of the 2013 Enigma Award for information security reporting.

Education
Grossman was born in New York City. She graduated from Cornell University in 1975.

Career

Writer and editor

In 1987, she founded the magazine The Skeptic in the United Kingdom and edited it for two years, resuming the editorship from 1999 to 2001. As founder and editor, she has appeared on numerous UK TV and radio programmes. Her credits since 1990 include work for Scientific American, The Guardian, and the Daily Telegraph, as well as New Scientist, Wired and Wired News, and The Inquirer for which she wrote a regular weekly net.wars column. That column continues in NewsWireless and on her own site every Friday. She was a columnist for Internet Today from July 1996 until it closed in April 1997, and together with Dominic Young ran the Fleet Street Forum on CompuServe UK in the mid-1990s.

She edited an anthology of interviews with leading computer industry figures taken from the pages of the British computer magazine Personal Computer World.  Entitled Remembering the Future, it was published in January 1997 by Springer Verlag. Her 1998 book net.wars was one of the first to have its full text published on the Web.
She was a member of an external board that advised Edinburgh University on the creation of the Intellectual Property and Law Centre.

She sits on the executive committee of the Association of British Science Writers and the Advisory Councils of the Open Rights Group and Privacy International.

In February 2011 Grossman was elected as a Fellow of the Committee for Skeptical Inquiry.

Folk singer
Grossman was a full-time folk singer from 1975 to 1983 and her folk album Roseville Fair was released in 1980. She also played on Archie Fisher's 1976 LP The Man With a Rhyme.

She was president of the Cornell Folk Song Club, the oldest university-affiliated, student-run folk song club in the US, from 1973 to 1975.

TV appearances
In 2005, Grossman featured on an episode of the BBC Three comedy spoof series High Spirits with Shirley Ghostman.

Awards
In 2013, Grossman was the winner of the Enigma Award, part of the BT Information Security Journalism Awards, "for her dedication and outstanding contribution to information security journalism, recognising her extensive writing on the subject for several publications over a number of years".

Works
 Remembering the Future: Interviews from Personal Computer World (1996)
 Net.wars (1998)
 From Anarchy to Power: The Net Comes of Age (2001)
 The Daily Telegraph A–Z Guide to the Internet (2001)
 The Daily Telegraph Small Business Guide to Computer Networking (2003)
 Why Statues Weep: The Best of the "Skeptic" (2010) – with Chris French

References

External links
 Official website
 Wendy Grossman on LiveJournal
 Wendy Grossman in The Guardian
 NewsWirelessNet, where her column net.wars appears every Friday
 Full text of net.wars, Wendy Grossman, 1997–99 NYU Press, 

1954 births
Living people
21st-century American non-fiction writers
American bloggers
American folk singers
American technology writers
American women bloggers
American women journalists
Cornell University alumni
Riverdale Country School alumni
Women technology writers
Writers from New York City
20th-century American non-fiction writers
20th-century American women writers
21st-century American women writers
20th-century American journalists
21st-century American journalists